This list tracks and ranks the population of the ten most populous cities and other settlements in the State of Florida by decade, as reported by each decennial United States Census, starting with the 1830 Census.

The Census Bureau's definition of an "urban place" has included a variety of designations, including city, town, township, village, borough, and municipality. The top places from 1830 through 1850 consisted of various places designated as cities, towns and other settlements. The top 10 urban areas in 2020 are all separate incorporated places.

This list generally refers only to the population of individual urban places within their defined limits at the time of the indicated census. Some of these places have since been annexed or merged into other cities. Other places may have expanded their borders due to such annexation or consolidation.

1830 

The first United States Census taken as the Territory of Florida.

1840

1850

The 1850 census is the first census taken since statehood in 1845.

1860

1860 was the eve of the American Civil War. This was the eighth United States Census. The majority of the population lived in cities and towns in Northern Florida. In summary, nine out of ten cities would exceed 1,000 residents.

1870 

This was the ninth United States Census.

1880

1890 

The 1890 Census was the eleventh.

1895 
The 1895 Census was the second conducted by the State of Florida.

1900 

The 1900 Census was the twelfth.

1905 
The 1905 Census was the third conducted by the State of Florida.

1910 

The 1910 Census was the thirteenth.

1915 
The 1915 Census was the fourth conducted by the State of Florida.

1920 

The 1920 Census was the fourteenth.

1930 

The 1930 Census was the fifteenth. The center of population would shift southward. Three cities would reach 100,000.

1940 

The 1940 Census was the sixteenth. The top three cities would remain over the 100,000 level. Rank for the seven largest cities remained unchanged since 1930.

1950 

1950 was a watershed year for many cities in Florida. For the first time, Central and South Florida begin to dominate the list with eight out of the top ten cities located in these areas.

1960 

The 1960 Census was the eighteenth. This is the last census in which any city west of the Apalachicola river has been in the top 10.

1970 

The 1970 Census was the nineteenth.

1980

1990

The 1990 Census was the twenty-first.

2000

The 2000 census was the 22nd in U.S. history. This is the first census when all ten cities passed the 100,000 mark.

2010

2020

See also
Florida
Demographics of Florida
List of municipalities in Florida
List of places in Florida
Florida statistical areas
List of metropolitan areas of Florida
List of urbanized areas in Florida (by population)

List of most populous cities in the United States by decade

References

Notes

Sources

External links 

Florida
Florida geography-related lists